The following is a list of county roads in Jackson County, Florida.  All county roads are maintained by the county in which they reside. Not all county roads contain shields, nor are all of them paved.

County roads in Jackson County

References

FDOT Map of Jackson County
FDOT GIS data, accessed January 2014

 
County